Erika Schönfeld is a retired East German slalom canoeist who competed in the mid-1960s. She won two medals at the 1965 ICF Canoe Slalom World Championships in Spittal, with a gold in the Mixed C-2 team event and a bronze in the Mixed C-2 event.

References

East German female canoeists
Possibly living people
Year of birth missing (living people)
Medalists at the ICF Canoe Slalom World Championships